A.O. Anagennisi Ierapetra, short for Athlitikos Omilos Anagennisi Ierapetra and more commonly known as Anagennisi Ierapetra or simply Anagennisi, is a Greek association football club based in Ierapetra, Lasithi, Crete. The club was founded in 1979. The club currently competes in the regional Lasithi FCA A Division Championship, the top-level amateur football division in Lasithi, and host their home games at the «Petros Vouzounerakis» Stadium in Ierapetra. Their greatest accomplishments to date include their promotion to the Gamma Ethniki, the third tier of the Greek football league system in 2014, and reaching the Semi-Finals of the Greek Football Amateur Cup in 1993.

History
Anagennisi Ierapetra was established in 1979. Between 1979 and 1982, the club celebrated three promotions, from the B Division of the Lasithi FCA regional league system to the Delta Ethniki, the fourth tier of the Greek football league system. During the 1992−93 season, Anagennisi reached the Greek Football Amateur Cup Semi-Finals for the first time in their history, but were eliminated by eventual competition winners Kozani during penalty shootout. In 2014, they achieved promotion to the Gamma Ethniki for the first time in club history, but were instantly relegated at the end of the season.

Crest and colours
At the start of 2010−11 season, Anagennisi merged with the other two clubs representing the town of Ierapetra, O.F. Ierapetra and A.S. Ierapetra thus forming Ierapetra F.C. However at the end of the season, the merger broke up. For the 2011−12 season, the club was renamed I.F.C. Anagennisi and incorporated its original crest in the I.F.C. logo. Since 2012, the club name and crest were completely restored.

Honours

Regional
Lasithi FCA Championship
Winners (8): 1983–84, 1986–87, 1988–89, 1995–96, 1997–98, 2004–05, 2007–08, 2013–14
Lasithi FCA Cup
Winners (8): 1992–93, 1994–95, 1995–96, 1996–97, 2002–03, 2008–09, 2010–11 (as I.F.C.), 2012–13

References

External links

Football clubs in Lasithi
Football clubs in Crete
Association football clubs established in 1979
1979 establishments in Greece
Gamma Ethniki clubs